Willy Reiber (20 February 1895 – 27 November 1980) was a German film director, producer and set designer. For many years he worked for the forerunners of Bavaria Film at the Emelka Studios in Munich.

Selected filmography
 The Drums of Asia (1921)
 Monna Vanna (1922)
 The Favourite of the Queen (1922)
 Trutzi from Trutzberg (1922)
 The Way to the Light (1923)
 Maciste and the Chinese Chest (1923)
 The Tragedy of a Night of Passion (1924)
 Taras Bulba (1924)
 Love of Life (1924)
 The Lion of Venice (1924)
 A Song from Days of Youth (1925)
 Written in the Stars (1925)
 Little Inge and Her Three Fathers  (1926)
 Storm Tide (1927)
 Klettermaxe (1927)
 Spy of Madame Pompadour (1928)
 The Gambling Den of Montmartre (1928)
 The Sun Rises (1934)
 Men, Animals and Sensations (1938)
 The Fire Devil (1940)

References

Bibliography
 Giesen, Rolf. Nazi Propaganda Films: A History and Filmography. McFarland, 2003.

External links

1895 births
1980 deaths
Film people from Munich